Prologue is a grey market album by Elton John featuring music publishing demonstration recordings made in the 1960s. It features four songs with Linda Peters on vocals, who would later marry musician Richard Thompson. John sings the remaining titles. The CD is a copy of a promotional 1970 vinyl demo album for producer Joe Boyd's Warlock label. Only 100 of the original vinyl albums are purported to have been made, of which six are known to exist today. The CD is a poor quality copy of a damaged vinyl record. Stylistically, it is very similar to Tumbleweed Connection. The songs are all written by artists signed to Warlock, including Nick Drake and John Martyn.

Track listing
 "Saturday Sun"
 "Sweet Honesty"
 "Stormbringer"
 "Way to Blue"
 "Go Out and Get It"
 "The Day Is Done"
 "Time Has Told Me"
 "You Get Brighter"
 "This Moment"
 "I Don't Mind"
 "Pied Pauper"

2001 compilation albums
Elton John compilation albums